Ebrahim Shakouri (born 16 February 1984 in Tehran, Iran) is a retired Iranian football defender. He is former general secretary of Iran Football Federation and current Executive Chairman of Persepolis Football Club.

Club career
He was a regular player in 2008–09 season for Payam and moved to Persepolis in June 2009.  He usually plays on the left because he is a natural left footed player.

Club career statistics
Last Update:  15 May 2015 

 Assist Goals

Honours
Saipa
Iranian Football League: 2006–07

Persepolis
Hazfi Cup: 2009–10, 2010–11

External links 
 Ebrahim Shakouri at PersianLeague.com

1984 births
Living people
Payam Mashhad players
Saipa F.C. players
Iranian footballers
Persepolis F.C. players
Association football defenders